Leonardo Cilaurren Uriarte ( 5 November 1912 – 9 December 1969) was a Spanish international footballer who played professionally as a midfielder in Spain, Argentina, Uruguay and Mexico between 1929 and 1945.

Career

Club career
Born in Bilbao in the Basque Country, Cilaurren played club football in Spain for Arenas Club de Getxo and Athletic Bilbao prior to the Spanish Civil War. With Athletic, he won the Copa del Rey in 1933 and La Liga in 1933–34 before his career was interrupted by the conflict.
 
During the 1938–39 season, he played for Club Deportivo Euzkadi (the Basque exiles' team) in the Mexican league. In 1939 he joined River Plate in Argentina where he played 19 times, scoring 3 goals. He then played for CA Peñarol of Uruguay before returning to Mexico in 1943 where he played for Real Club España and was part of the team that won the League title in 1943–44, the Mexican Cup in 1944–45 and two editions of the Mexican Super Cup in 1944 and 1945.

International career
Cilaurren earned 14 caps for the Spanish national side between 1931 and 1935, and participated at the 1934 FIFA World Cup. From 1937 to 1939 he was part of the Basque Country national football team which toured Europa and the Americas.

References
General

Specific

External links

1912 births
1969 deaths
Spanish footballers
Spanish expatriate footballers
Spain international footballers
Footballers from the Basque Country (autonomous community)
La Liga players
Arenas Club de Getxo footballers
Athletic Bilbao footballers
Club Atlético River Plate footballers
Peñarol players
Real Club España footballers
Liga MX players
1934 FIFA World Cup players
Expatriate footballers in Argentina
Expatriate footballers in Uruguay
Expatriate footballers in Mexico
Spanish expatriate sportspeople in Argentina
Spanish expatriate sportspeople in Uruguay
Spanish expatriate sportspeople in Mexico
Association football midfielders
Basque Country international footballers